Cacozeliana granarium is a species of sea snail, a marine gastropod mollusk in the family Cerithiidae.

Distribution
This species occurs in the Indian Ocean off Madagascar.

This species is native to Australia with known distributions in Western Australia, South Australia, Victoria, Tasmania, New South Wales, and Queensland.

References

External links

Cerithiidae
Gastropods described in 1842